Top Álbuns Brasil (previously CD – TOP 20 Semanal ABPD or CD TOP 20) was a Brazilian official sales chart for musical releases. All rankings are researched and compiled by Nielsen and published by Pro-Música Brasil.

See also
List of number-one albums of 2009 (Brazil)

References

Pro-Música Brasil
Brazilian record charts